Ravna Gora (Slavic meaning "flat hill") may refer to several places:

Serbia
 Ravna Gora (highland), a highland in Serbia known for its relation with the Chetnik movement
 Ravna Gora (Ivanjica), a village near Ivanjica
 Ravna Gora (Vlasotince), a village near Vlasotince

Croatia
 Ravna Gora, Croatia, a village in Gorski Kotar
 Ravna Gora (Slavonia), a mountain in Slavonia
 Ravna gora (Trakošćan), a mountain in Zagorje

Bulgaria
Ravna Gora, Burgas Province, a village
Ravna Gora, Varna Province, a village
Ravna gora, Haskovo Province, a village

See also 
 Javorska Ravna Gora, a village near Ivanjica, Serbia
 Ravna (disambiguation)